Pellasimnia is a genus of predatory sea snails, marine gastropod mollusk in the subfamily Ovulinae of the family Ovulidae, sometimes known as the false cowries and the cowry allies.

Species
According to the World Register of Marine Species (WoRMS) the following species with accepted names are included within the genus Pellasimnia :
Pellasimnia angasi (Reeve, 1865) - the type species of the genus
Pellasimnia annabelae Lorenz & Fehse, 2009
Pellasimnia brunneiterma (Cate, 1969)
Pellasimnia cleaveri Lorenz & Fehse, 2009
Pellasimnia hochmuthi Lorenz & Fehse, 2009
Pellasimnia improcera (Azuma & Cate, 1971)
 † Pellasimnia maxwelli Beu & B. A. Marshall, 2011
Pellasimnia mcoyi (Tenison-Woods, 1878)
Species brought into synonymy
Pellasimnia aurantia Carlsson, 1969: synonym of Phenacovolva aurantia (Sowerby, 1889)
Pellasimnia exsul Iredale, 1935: synonym of Pellasimnia maccoyi (Tenison-Woods, 1878)
Pellasimnia verconis Cotton & Godfrey, 1932: synonym of Cuspivolva helenae (Cate, 1973)

References

Ovulidae